Clementine Shepherd Ford (born June 29, 1979) is an American actress known for her appearance as Molly Kroll on Showtime's The L Word. In April 2009, she joined the cast of the soap opera The Young and the Restless in the role of Mackenzie Browning. She left the show in 2010.

Early life and career
She is the daughter of actress Cybill Shepherd and nightclub entertainer David Ford. Ford has two half-siblings, Molly "Ariel" Shepherd Oppenheim and Cyrus "Zack" Shepherd Oppenheim from her mother's remarriage to chiropractor Bruce Oppenheim.

Ford made her acting debut on her mother's eponymous sitcom in 1998. That same year, she was named Miss Golden Globe and assisted at the 56th Golden Globe Awards ceremony. She made her film debut in a bit role in 1999 in the teen comedy film American Pie. She has since had supporting roles in Bring It On (2000) and Cherry Falls (2000). From 2007 to 2009, she portrayed Molly Kroll (the daughter of Phyllis Kroll, who was played by Shepherd) on the Showtime drama series The L Word. In 2009, she won the role of Mackenzie Browning on the soap opera The Young and the Restless. She left the series in 2010. In June 2011, Ford featured in People magazine for embracing her real body.

In March 2012, it was announced that Ford would star in the stage play Phantoms Go Down. The play was written by Ford's half-sister, Ariel Shepherd-Oppenheim.

Personal life
In 2011, stated that she was a vegan.

According to her mother, Cybill Shepherd, Ford suffers from multiple sclerosis.

Relationships and marriages
In 2000, Ford married Canadian actor Chad Todhunter. They divorced in 2004.

In March 2009, Ford revealed that she is bisexual in an interview with Diva magazine. In May 2009, Ford told Soap Opera Digest that she was in a relationship with musician and record producer Linda Perry. 
Their relationship ended in 2011.

In May 2012, Ford announced her engagement to actor Cyrus Wilcox. The couple married in April 2013.  She gave birth to the couple's first child in March 2014, and to their second child on September 13, 2016.

Stage
Phantoms Go Down (2012) – Rosalind

Filmography

Film

Television

References

External links

1979 births
20th-century American actresses
21st-century American actresses
Actresses from Memphis, Tennessee
American bloggers
American film actresses
American soap opera actresses
American stage actresses
American television actresses
Bisexual actresses
Living people
American women bloggers
LGBT people from Tennessee
21st-century American LGBT people
American bisexual actors